Ridin' High is an album by the American soul music group the Impressions, released in 1966.

Track listing
All tracks written by Curtis Mayfield unless noted. "I Need To Belong To Someone" was recorded by the group three times: first, when they backed Jerry Butler on 1963 solo single (titled "Need to Belong"); second on this LP; and third on the Times Have Changed LP in 1972 featuring LeRoy Hutson (spoken intro) and Sam Gooden (lead).

Side One
 "Ridin’ High" 2:25
 "No One Else" 2:37
 "Gotta Get Away" 2:28
 "I Need to Belong to Someone" 3:25 (Curtis and Sam lead)
 "Right on Time" 2:43
 "I Need a Love" 2:25

Side Two
 "Too Slow", 2:44
 "Man’s Temptation" 4:45
 "That’s What Mama Say" 2:34
 "Let It Be Me" (Gilbert Bécaud, Pierre Delanoë, Mann Curtis) 3:02
 "I’m a Telling You" 2:41

Personnel
The Impressions
Curtis Mayfield – lead vocals, guitar
Fred Cash – backing vocals
Sam Gooden – backing vocals
with:
with:
The Funk Brothers – instrumentation
The Boston Symphony Orchestra – instrumentation
Johnny Pate – producer, arrangements, conductor

Charts

References

1966 albums
The Impressions albums
Albums produced by Johnny Pate
ABC Records albums